AgriBank is a U.S. Farm Credit Bank that is part of the U.S. Farm Credit System.

AgriBank may also refer to:

 Vietnam Bank for Agriculture and Rural Development a commercial bank in Vietnam also known as Agribank
 AgriBank PLC, a bank in Malta
 Agricultural Development Bank of Zimbabwe (ADBZ), also known as Agribank
 Keshavarzi Bank, an Iranian bank also known as Agribank